Dinematichthyidae is a family of fishes belonging to the order Ophidiiformes.

Genera and species:
 Genus Alionematichthys Møller & Schwarzhans, 2008
 Alionematichthys ceylonensis Møller & Schwarzhans, 2008
 Alionematichthys crassiceps Møller & Schwarzhans, 2008
 Alionematichthys minyomma (Sedor & Cohen, 1987)
 Alionematichthys phuketensis Møller & Schwarzhans, 2008
 Alionematichthys piger (Alcock, 1890)
 Alionematichthys plicatosurculus Møller & Schwarzhans, 2008
 Alionematichthys riukiuensis (Aoyagi, 1954)
 Alionematichthys samoaensis Møller & Schwarzhans, 2008
 Alionematichthys shinoharai Møller & Schwarzhans, 2008
 Alionematichthys suluensis Møller & Schwarzhans, 2008
 Alionematichthys winterbottomi Møller & Schwarzhans, 2008 
 Genus Beaglichthys Machida, 1993
 Beaglichthys bleekeri Schwarzhans & Møller, 2007
 Beaglichthys larsonae Schwarzhans & Møller, 2007
 Beaglichthys macrophthalmus Machida, 1993
 Genus Brosmolus Machida, 1993
 Brosmolus longicaudus Machida, 1993
 Genus Brotulinella Schwarzhans, Møller & Nielsen, 2005
 Brotulinella taiwanensis Schwarzhans, Møller & Nielsen, 2005
 Genus Dactylosurculus Schwarzhans & Møller, 2007
 Dactylosurculus gomoni Schwarzhans & Møller, 2007
 Genus Dermatopsis Ogilby, 1896
 Dermatopsis greenfieldi Moller & Schwarzhans, 2006
 Dermatopsis hoesei Moller & Schwarzhans, 2006
 Dermatopsis joergennielseni Moller & Schwarzhans, 2006
 Dermatopsis macrodon Ogilby, 1896
 Genus Dermatopsoides Smith, 1948
 Dermatopsoides andersoni Moller & Schwarzhans, 2006
 Dermatopsoides kasougae (Smith, 1943)
 Dermatopsoides morrisonae Moller & Schwarzhans, 2006
 Dermatopsoides talboti Cohen, 1966
 Genus Diancistrus Ogilby 1899
 Diancistrus alatus Schwarzhans, Møller & Nielsen, 2005
 Diancistrus alleni Schwarzhans, Møller & Nielsen, 2005
 Diancistrus altidorsalis Schwarzhans, Møller & Nielsen, 2005
 Diancistrus atollorum Schwarzhans, Møller & Nielsen, 2005
 Diancistrus beateae Schwarzhans, Møller & Nielsen, 2005
 Diancistrus brevirostris Schwarzhans, Møller & Nielsen, 2005
 Diancistrus eremitus Schwarzhans, Møller & Nielsen, 2005
 Diancistrus erythraeus (Fowler, 1946)
 Diancistrus fijiensis Schwarzhans, Møller & Nielsen, 2005
 Diancistrus fuscus (Fowler, 1946)
 Diancistrus jackrandalli Schwarzhans, Møller & Nielsen, 2005
 Diancistrus jeffjohnsoni Schwarzhans, Møller & Nielsen, 2005
 Diancistrus karinae Schwarzhans, Møller & Nielsen, 2005
 Diancistrus katrineae Schwarzhans, Møller & Nielsen, 2005
 Diancistrus leisi Schwarzhans, Møller & Nielsen, 2005
 Diancistrus longifilis Ogilby, 1899
 Diancistrus machidai Schwarzhans, Møller & Nielsen, 2005
 Diancistrus manciporus Schwarzhans, Møller & Nielsen, 2005
 Diancistrus mcgroutheri Schwarzhans, Møller & Nielsen, 2005
 Diancistrus mennei Schwarzhans, Møller & Nielsen, 2005
 Diancistrus niger Schwarzhans, Møller & Nielsen, 2005
 Diancistrus novaeguineae (Machida, 1996)
 Diancistrus pohnpeiensis Schwarzhans, Møller & Nielsen, 2005
 Diancistrus robustus Schwarzhans, Møller & Nielsen, 2005
 Diancistrus springeri Schwarzhans, Møller & Nielsen, 2005
 Diancistrus tongaensis Schwarzhans, Møller & Nielsen, 2005
 Diancistrus vietnamensis Schwarzhans, Møller & Nielsen, 2005
 Genus Didymothallus Schwarzhans & Møller, 2007
 Didymothallus criniceps Schwarzhans & Møller, 2007
 Didymothallus mizolepis (Günther, 1867)
 Didymothallus nudigena Schwarzhans & Møller, 2011
 Didymothallus pruvosti Schwarzhans & Møller, 2007
 Genus Dinematichthys Bleeker, 1855 
 Dinematichthys dasyrhynchus Cohen & Hutchins, 1982
 Dinematichthys iluocoeteoides Bleeker, 1855
 Dinematichthys indicus Machida, 1994
 Dinematichthys megasoma Machida, 1994
 Dinematichthys minyomma Sedor & Cohen, 1987
 Dinematichthys randalli Machida, 1994
 Dinematichthys riukiuensis Aoyagi, 1954
 Dinematichthys trilobatus Møller & Schwarzhans, 2008
 Genus Dipulus Waite, 1905
 Dipulus caecus Waite, 1905
 Dipulus hutchinsi Moller & Schwarzhans, 2006
 Dipulus multiradiatus (McCulloch & Waite, 1918)
 Dipulus norfolkanus Machida, 1993
 Genus Eusurculus Schwarzhans & Møller, 2007
 Eusurculus andamanensis Schwarzhans & Møller, 2007
 Eusurculus pistillum Schwarzhans & Møller, 2007
 Eusurculus pristinus Schwarzhans & Møller, 2007
 Genus Gunterichthys Dawson, 1966 
 Gunterichthys bussingi Møller, Schwarzhans & Nielsen, 2004
 Gunterichthys coheni Møller, Schwarzhans & Nielsen, 2004
 Gunterichthys longipenis Dawson, 1966
 Genus Lapitaichthys  
 Lapitaichthys frickei Schwarzhans & Møller, 2007
 Genus Majungaichthys Schwarzhans & Møller, 2007
 Majungaichthys agalegae Schwarzhans & Møller, 2011
 Majungaichthys simplex Schwarzhans & Møller, 2007
 Genus Mascarenichthys Schwarzhans & Møller, 2007
 Mascarenichthys heemstrai Schwarzhans & Møller, 2007
 Mascarenichthys microphthalmus Schwarzhans & Møller, 2007
 Mascarenichthys remotus Schwarzhans & Møller, 2011
 Genus Monothrix Ogilby, 1897 
 Monothrix polylepis Ogilby, 1897
 Genus Nielsenichthys Schwarzhans & Møller, 2011
 Nielsenichthys pullus Schwarzhans & Møller, 2011
 Genus Ogilbia Jordan & Evermann 1898
 Ogilbia boehlkei Møller, Schwarzhans & Nielsen, 2005 
 Ogilbia boydwalkeri Møller, Schwarzhans & Nielsen, 2005 
 Ogilbia cayorum Evermann & Kendall, 1898
 Ogilbia cocoensis Møller, Schwarzhans & Nielsen, 2005 
 Ogilbia davidsmithi Møller, Schwarzhans & Nielsen, 2005 
 Ogilbia deroyi (Poll & van Mol, 1966)
 Ogilbia galapagosensis (Poll & LeLeup, 1965)
 Ogilbia jeffwilliamsi Møller, Schwarzhans & Nielsen, 2005 
 Ogilbia jewettae Møller, Schwarzhans & Nielsen, 2005 
 Ogilbia mccoskeri Møller, Schwarzhans & Nielsen, 2005 
 Ogilbia nigromarginata Møller, Schwarzhans & Nielsen, 2005 
 Ogilbia nudiceps Møller, Schwarzhans & Nielsen, 2005 
 Ogilbia robertsoni Møller, Schwarzhans & Nielsen, 2005 
 Ogilbia sabaji Møller, Schwarzhans & Nielsen, 2005 
 Ogilbia sedorae Møller, Schwarzhans & Nielsen, 2005 
 Ogilbia suarezae Møller, Schwarzhans & Nielsen, 2005 
 Ogilbia tyleri Møller, Schwarzhans & Nielsen, 2005 
 Ogilbia ventralis (Gill, 1863)
 Genus Ogilbichthys Møller, Schwarzhans & Nielsen, 2004 
 Ogilbichthys ferocis Møller, Schwarzhans & Nielsen, 2004 	 
 Ogilbichthys haitiensis Møller, Schwarzhans & Nielsen, 2004 	 
 Ogilbichthys kakuki Møller, Schwarzhans & Nielsen, 2004 	 
 Ogilbichthys longimanus Møller, Schwarzhans & Nielsen, 2004 	 
 Ogilbichthys microphthalmus Møller, Schwarzhans & Nielsen, 2004 	 
 Ogilbichthys puertoricoensis Møller, Schwarzhans & Nielsen, 2004 	 
 Ogilbichthys tobagoensis Møller, Schwarzhans & Nielsen, 2004
 Genus Paradiancistrus Schwarzhans, Møller & Nielsen, 2005
 Paradiancistrus acutirostris Schwarzhans, Møller & Nielsen, 2005
 Paradiancistrus christmasensis Schwarzhans & Møller, 2011
 Paradiancistrus cuyoensis Schwarzhans, Møller & Nielsen, 2005
 Paradiancistrus lombokensis Schwarzhans & Møller, 2007
 Genus Porocephalichthys Møller & Schwarzhans, 2008
 Porocephalichthys dasyrhynchus (Cohen & Hutchins, 1982)
 Genus Pseudogilbia Møller, Schwarzhans & Nielsen, 2004 
 Pseudogilbia sanblasensis Møller, Schwarzhans & Nielsen, 2004 
 Genus Typhlias Whitley, 1951
 Typhlias pearsei Hubbs, 1938
 Genus Ungusurculus Schwarzhans & Møller, 2007
 Ungusurculus collettei Schwarzhans & Møller, 2007
 Ungusurculus komodoensis Schwarzhans & Møller, 2007
 Ungusurculus philippinensis Schwarzhans & Møller, 2007
 Ungusurculus riauensis Schwarzhans & Møller, 2007
 Ungusurculus sundaensis Schwarzhans & Møller, 2007
 Ungusurculus williamsis Schwarzhans & Møller, 2007
 Genus Zephyrichthys Schwarzhans & Møller, 2007
 Zephyrichthys barryi Schwarzhans & Møller, 2007

References

Further reading
 Peter Rask Møller, Steen Wilhelm Knudsen, Werner Schwarzhans, Jørgen G. Nielsen: A new classification of viviparous brotulas (Bythitidae) – with the establishment of a new family Dinematichthyidae – based on molecular, morphological and fossil data. Molecular Phylogenetics and Evolution, April 2016, doi:10.1016/j.ympev.2016.04.008

Ophidiiformes
Ray-finned fish families